Phyllonorycter heegeriella is a moth of the family Gracillariidae. It is found in all of Europe, except the Iberian Peninsula and the Balkan Peninsula.

The wingspan is 6,5-8,5 mm. The forewings are shining white ; a fuscous median line from base to middle ; four costal and three dorsal dark fuscous strigulae, anteriorly more or less broadly margined with pale yellow-ochreous ; apex pale yellow-ochreous, enclosing an elongate black apical dot ; an ill-defined dark hook in apical cilia. Hindwings pale grey.

Adults are on wing in May and August in two generations in western Europe.

The larvae feed on Quercus petraea and Quercus robur. They mine the leaves of their host plant. They create a very small lower-surface, tentiform mine. The mine is usually situated near the leaf margin or in a leaf lobe. Mines of the summer generation have one fold, those of the fall generation have a large number of fine wrinkles. The pupa is made in a cocoon. The summer cocoon is small and white and fastened to both the floor and the ceiling of the mine. The cocoon made by the autumn generation is larger, yet more delicate, and is completely free of frass.

References

External links
Fauna Europaea
Leafminers and plant galls of Europe
lepiforum.de

heegeriella
Moths described in 1846
Moths of Europe
Taxa named by Philipp Christoph Zeller